Shahmirzad District is a district (bakhsh) in Mehdishahr County, Semnan Province, Iran. It was formed after the 2006 census.  The District has one city: Shahmirzad. The District has two rural districts (dehestan): Chashm Rural District and Poshtkuh Rural District.

References 

Districts of Semnan Province
Mehdishahr County